The Torre della Ghirlandina or simply Ghirlandina is the bell tower of the Cathedral of Modena, in Emilia-Romagna, Italy.

Standing at 86.12 metres, the tower is the traditional symbol of Modena, being visible from all directions outside the city.

The structure was set up in 1179 on five floors, initially called Torre di San Geminiano. To compete with Bologna's towers, the Comune added the characteristic octagonal cusp, designed by Arrigo da Campione, one of the numerous masters from Campione who took part in the cathedral's renovation in the 13th-15th centuries. The top of the tower is decorated with two ghirlande (two marble railings), whence the name.

In the interior, the Sala della Secchia room (with 15th-century frescoes) is home of a copy of the depiction of the Secchia rapita, a memory of the tower's former role as treasury of the Modenese Comune. Also notable are the sculpted capitals in the Sala dei Torresani hall, in the fifth floor.
The five bells are tuned in C major, cast during the Renaissance period. It also has a stand for the oaken bucket from the War of the Bucket.

Restoration 

The tower underwent a restoration started in December 2007. At the beginning it was said it would be finished by the year 2010, but restoration work lasted till September 2011.  During the work, the scaffolding was hidden behind an artistic screen painted by the Italian sculptor Mimmo Paladino.  This choice has caused perplexity in the town, given the high cost of the operation and the very idea of it.

Sources 
This article was originally a translation of this version of :it:Ghirlandina from the Italian-language Wikipedia and the Emilian e Rumagnòl-language Wikipedia :eml:Ghirlandèina.
The Ghirlandina Tower: Conservation Project
The Ghirlandina Tower: History and Restoration 

Buildings and structures in Modena
World Heritage Sites in Italy
Ghirlandina
Buildings and structures completed in 1179